Alphonse Couturier (12 February 1885 – 11 July 1973) was a member of the Legislative Assembly of Quebec for the Union Nationale.

He owned a sawmill in Saint-Louis-du-Ha! Ha!, Quebec from 1909 to 1936, and was mayor of that town from 1931 to 1936.  He was mayor of Marsoui, Quebec from 1950 to 1960.

He was first elected to the Legislative Assembly in the 1952 Quebec general election for the Union Nationale in the Gaspé-Nord electoral district.  He was re-elected in 1956, but was defeated in 1960.

References

1885 births
1973 deaths
Union Nationale (Quebec) MNAs
Mayors of places in Quebec
People from Bas-Saint-Laurent